Ice cream cake is a cake made with ice cream.

Ice cream cake may also refer to:

Ice Cream Cake (EP), debut EP by South Korean band Red Velvet
Ice Cream Cake (song), a song by South Korean band Red Velvet
Ice Cream and Cake, a song by the Buckwheat Boyz